Malcolm Ernest Scott (8 May 1936 – 11 September 2020) was an English cricketer active from 1953 to 1969 who played for Northamptonshire (Northants). He was born in South Shields on 8 May 1936. He appeared in 185 first-class matches as a righthanded batsman who bowled left-arm orthodox spin. He scored 2,445 runs with a highest score of 62 and took 461 wickets with a best performance of seven for 32.

Scott played as a centre half in the Football League for Newcastle United, Darlington and York City between 1956 and 1964.

In 2009, Scott wrote his autobiography, A Geordie All-Rounder: An Autobiography of a South Shields Sportsman.

Scott died on 11 September 2020 aged 84. His wife Mary died in 2017; they had no children.

References

1936 births
2020 deaths
Cricketers from South Shields
English cricketers
Northamptonshire cricketers
Combined Services cricketers
Durham cricketers
English footballers
Association football defenders
Newcastle United F.C. players
Darlington F.C. players
York City F.C. players
English Football League players